Alejandro García "Álex" Oyón (born 23 January 2003) is a Spanish professional footballer who plays as a forward for Sporting de Gijón B.

Club career
Born in Gijón, Asturias, Oyón joined Sporting de Gijón's Mareo in 2011, from CD Roces. On 19 July 2019, he agreed to a professional contract with the club.

Oyón made his senior debut with the reserves on 7 March 2021, coming on as a late substitute in a 0–1 Segunda División B away loss against Real Oviedo Vetusta. His first goal as a senior came on 12 September, as he scored the equalizer for the B's in a 3–2 Tercera División RFEF home win over L'Entregu CF.

Oyón made his first team debut on 12 November 2021, replacing fellow youth graduate Pablo García in a 0–1 home loss against Real Sociedad B in the Segunda División.

References

External links

2003 births
Living people
Footballers from Gijón
Spanish footballers
Association football forwards
Segunda División players
Segunda División B players
Tercera Federación players
Sporting de Gijón B players
Sporting de Gijón players